Christian Vannequé (20 August 1949 – 9 January 2015) was a French sommelier and restaurateur.

Career
In 1967, he began at the three star Tour d'Argent restaurant in Paris as an assistant cellar man. He rose to become the restaurant's head sommelier, at 20 years old the youngest head sommelier in France. He served as an expert wine taster at the Paris Wine Tasting of 1976, and also participated in The Judgment of Paris 30th Anniversary.

In later years, Vannequé opened restaurants of his own in France, the United States, and Bali.

1811 Chateau d'Yquem purchase
On July 26, 2011, Vannequé set a record for the highest price paid for a bottle of white wine,   purchasing a bottle of Chateau d'Yquem, vintage 1811, for £75,000 (US$123,000) from The Antique Wine Company.

References

Further reading
 

 

Sommeliers
2015 deaths
1946 births
French restaurateurs